Patrick Errol Higginbotham (born December 16, 1938) is an American judge and lawyer who serves as a Senior United States circuit judge of the United States Court of Appeals for the Fifth Circuit.

Background and education 
Judge Higginbotham was born in McCalla, Alabama to George and Ann Higginbotham (née Tumlin). The youngest of three, Higginbotham showed academic promise early in life.

Higginbotham received a Bachelor of Arts degree from the University of Alabama in 1960, attending on a tennis scholarship offered to him by then-Athletic-Director Paul "Bear" Bryant and serving as the team captain. He finished college and law school in just five years and received in 1961 a Bachelor of Laws from the University of Alabama School of Law at Tuscaloosa, where he also met Elizabeth, his eventual wife of 52 years.

Career

He was in the United States Air Force, JAG Corps from 1961 to 1964. He then joined Coke & Coke in Dallas, Texas from 1964 to 1975, where he primarily worked in antitrust litigation. He was an adjunct professor of constitutional law at the Southern Methodist University School of Law in 1976.

Federal judicial service

District court 
Higginbotham was nominated by President Gerald Ford on December 2, 1975, to a seat on the United States District Court for the Northern District of Texas vacated by Judge Sarah T. Hughes. He was confirmed by the United States Senate on December 12, 1975, and received commission the same day. At the time he was appointed to the District Court, he was the youngest sitting judge in the country. His service was terminated on August 3, 1982, due to elevation to the Fifth Circuit. He was succeeded by Judge Joe Fish.

Appellate court 
Higginbotham was nominated by President Ronald Reagan on July 1, 1982, to a seat on the United States Court of Appeals for the Fifth Circuit vacated by Judge Reynaldo Guerra Garza. He was unanimously confirmed by the Senate on July 27, 1982, and received commission on July 30, 1982. In 2005, he moved his chambers from Dallas, Texas to Austin, Texas. He assumed senior status on August 28, 2006.

Supreme Court consideration

In 1986, when the nomination of Robert Bork to the Supreme Court of the United States was flailing, Higginbotham was widely considered the leading replacement candidate.  After Senators Lloyd Bentsen and Dennis DeConcini came out in support of his nomination, the Reagan administration, unwilling to allow the senators to both prevent the appointment of Bork and dictate the next nominee, declined to nominate Higginbotham. The nomination eventually went to Justice Anthony Kennedy.

Other service

For many years, Higginbotham was a faculty member at the Federal Judicial Center and, as an appointee of Chief Justice William Rehnquist, the chairman of the Advisory Committee on Civil Rules. He served as president of the American Inns of Court Foundation, and in 1996 the Dallas chapter of that organization renamed itself after him. He has been a leading proponent and former chairman of The Center for American and International Law, a Dallas-based organization which aims to train foreign and domestic lawyers and police officers, a Fellow of the American Bar Association, chairman of its Appellate Judges Conference, member of the Board of Editors of the ABA Journal, and advisor to the National Center for State Courts on its study of habeas corpus. He is also a lifetime member of the American Law Institute and a member of the Board of Overseers, Institute of Civil Justice, RAND Corporation.

Speeches and writings

Higginbotham has published a number of articles in law reviews and newspapers. He is also a frequent speaker on various legal topics, particularly the death penalty and the decline of jury trials, having lectured at places including the Universities of Alabama, Chicago, St. Mary's, Texas, Texas Tech, Columbia, Duke, and Penn, as well as Case Western, Northwestern, Utah, Loyola, Hofstra, the National Science Foundation, The American College of Trial Lawyers and the National Institute of Trial Advocacy.

Personal life and present

Personal life 
Higginbotham married Elizabeth O'Neal in August 1961. They were married until her death from Alzheimer's disease on June 10, 2017, at the age of 78. They had two daughters, Anne Elizabeth and Patricia Lynn, and 6 grandchildren. Higginbotham lost his older sister, Jean, to ALS in 2002. His older brother, George, who graduated from law school in the same class as Higginbotham, died three weeks after Higginbotham's wife in 2017.

Notable opinions

In In re LTV Securities Litigation, 88 F.R.D. 134 (N.D. Tex. 1980), Higginbotham formulated one of the earliest versions of the "fraud on the market" theory of loss causation, using language later quoted by the Supreme Court when it adopted the theory, see Basic, Inc. v. Levinson, 485 U.S. 224, 244 (1988).
In Schultea v. Wood, 47 F.3d 1427 (5th Cir. 1995) (en banc), Higginbotham allowed under Rule 7 notice pleading in potential qualified immunity cases but required, in reply to an allegation of qualified immunity, more detailed pleading, a tack later approved by the Supreme Court.
In Flores v. City of Boerne, 73 F.3d 1352 (5th Cir. 1996), Higginbotham upheld the Religious Freedom Restoration Act against the claim that the Act exceeded Congress's powers under the Fourteenth Amendment. The Supreme Court later reversed the decision.
In Doe v. Beaumont Independent School District, 240 F.3d 462 (5th Cir. 2001) (en banc), Higginbotham found that public school students and their parents had standing to challenge district's "Clergy in Schools" volunteer counseling program and that facts issues required reversal of summary judgment to defendants.
In Van Orden v. Perry, 351 F.3d 173 (5th Cir. 2003), Higginbotham upheld against an Establishment Clause challenge a Ten Commandments display on the Texas State Capitol, concluding that its secular history and purpose rendered it constitutional.  The Supreme Court later affirmed.
Between 2000 and 2006, Higginbotham, sitting as the Circuit Judge along with two district judges in a Voting Rights Act three-judge panel, twice changed Texas's Congressional districts. His later effort, which struck a balance between competing interests while hewing closely to the Texas legislature's intent, was widely hailed.
In June Medical Services v. Russo, 30 F.3d 397 (5th Cir. 2018), Higginbotham dissented in a case upholding Louisiana's Act 620, which requires physicians performing abortions to have active admitting privileges at a hospital within thirty miles of a clinic.  Higginbotham criticized the majority for reviewing the statute de novo, as a district court would, saying, "Appellate judges are not the triers of fact. It is apparent that when abortion comes on stage it shadows the role of settled judicial rules."

Awards and recognition 

 The 100 Most Powerful People For the 80's (Next Magazine) - 1981
Daniel J. Meador Outstanding Alumnus Award (University of Alabama) - 1986
Samuel E. Gates Litigation Award (American College of Trial Lawyers) - 1997
 A. Sherman Christensen Award (American Inns of Court) - 2002
 Jurist of the Year Award (Texas Chapters of the American Board of Trial Advocates) - 2006
 Lewis F. Powell, Jr. Award for Professionalism and Ethics at a Celebration of Excellence (presented by Justice Alito in the United States Supreme Court) - 2008
 Chief Justice John Marshall Award for Lifetime achievement from the JAG Association - 2010
 St. Thomas More Award (St. Mary's School of Law, San Antonio, Texas) - 2011
 Chief Justice Jack Pope Professionalism and Integrity Award (Texas Center for Legal Ethics) - 2013

See also
 George H. W. Bush Supreme Court candidates
 List of United States federal judges by longevity of service

References

External links

 

1938 births
20th-century American judges
Judges of the United States Court of Appeals for the Fifth Circuit
Judges of the United States District Court for the Northern District of Texas
Living people
Texas Tech University faculty
United States court of appeals judges appointed by Ronald Reagan
United States district court judges appointed by Gerald Ford
University of Alabama alumni
Southern Methodist University faculty
People from McCalla, Alabama
People from Blanco, Texas
Military personnel from Alabama